Karel Martens (born 1939) is a Dutch freelance graphic designer, specialized in typography

Biography
Martens was born in Mook en Middelaar in 1939 and graduated from the Arnhem Academy of Art and Industrial Arts of the Netherlands in 1961  where he studied fine arts. He did not study graphic design because it was not considered a career at the time and therefore, did not exist as its own course of study. In school he took many classes such as painting, sculpture making, illustration, and publicity. Today he is recognized as one of the most influential practitioners in graphic design.

He started teaching at ArtEZ in Arnhem in 1977. In 1998 he, along with Wigger Bierma, founded the Werkplaats Typografie, a renowned Masters course for typography in Arnhem, Netherlands. Martens’s practice consists of designing and teaching. He is responsible for the design of architectural magazine OASE, in collaboration with current and former students. And he has designed books for publisher SUN in many varying formats. His work has also included designing coins, postage stamps and telephone cards for the Dutch government.

In 1996 he was awarded the Dr A.H. Heineken Prize for Art, and in 2012 he won the Gerrit Noordzij Prize. He also received an honourable mention for the Rotterdam Design Prize in 1995.

His book Printed Matter, published in 1996 with Jaap van Triest, was declared the best designed book in the world by the 1998 Leipzig Book Fair. His books, letterpress prints, and monoprints are highly revered and collectible.

He is included in a list of “one hundred of history's leading practitioners” in the book The Designer Says, along with other notable practitioners of graphic design.

Methods 
Many of Martens’ work ranges from posters, to prints and to editorials, but all have a strong emphasis on typography. He had always been fascinated with language, mathematics and color and he finds a way to incorporate all these interests into his designs.

His work is not glamorous. In fact, his monoprints series was created using found metal objects taken from discarded car parts, disks, and other miscellaneous objects collected from the side of the road. He uses these objects to print ink on found paper. His methods are slow but very precise—he prints one colour per day, waits for it to dry, and prints the second colour the next day. By this method, Martens’ prints may take days or weeks to be completed.

One of Martens’ longest on-going projects is his Stedelijk print collection. It began when the catalogues in the Stedelijk Museum in Amsterdam were being digitized and the old archive cards—designed by Willem Sandberg—were being discarded. Martens proceeded to take the documents and have been using them as a canvas for his projects since and each print is unique in that they are made from individual catalogue cards. These finalized prints are now used as diplomas, which will be presented to the Werkplaats students upon graduation.

Werkplaats Typografie 
The Werkplaats Typografie (WT) is a two-year graphic design master programme at the ArtEZ Institute of the Arts and was founded by Karel Martens and his former student Wigger Bierma in 1998. The idea to start Werkplaats Typografie came from the problems Martens found in existing models of design education in the Netherlands. He notes that “A little bit what I’m regretting now in design education is that it’s design, design, design, the students always looking in magazines, looking at how other designers are doing it—it’s incestuous…students often see inspiration in copying things, not in the energy of the work or the mentality behind the design but the flavor of it and the superficial work.” He did not want his programme to be a place that just churned out designers, but one that urges students to own styles and personalities.

The program is very hands-on and offers many collaborative opportunities to work with external clients. Since its conception, the school regularly invites guests to review student work, give presentations, or host workshops. The students are often invited to work with both international and national festivals and projects. In addition to these opportunities, students are expected to work on self-initiated projects as well as attend meetings, lectures, and seminars. The curriculum consists of three components:
 Presentations, individual and group critiques, workshops;
 practical assignments and
 theoretical orientation in the form of research, excursions and a final thesis. Through the programme they will learn how to find the balance their skills between personal expression and practical application and encouraged to approach design theoretically.

OASE 
The Werkplaats Typografie postgraduate program offers a lot of workshops. One reoccurring project Martens shares with successive groups of students is the design of OASE.

OASE is an independent, international, peer-reviewed architectural journal founded by students of Delft University of Technology in the early 80s. Martens has since took over designing the journal since 1990. Martens uses the magazine as space for experimental design. He states that “this magazine is a kind of dialogue with the contributes. For me this is very important: I’m from a modernist background and in the beginning that was always working with a grid, and using Helvetica and every company had the same logo and colours—a kind of uniformity. For me OASE was a good reason to break from the uniformity of the modern movement, although I still believe in the modern movement but not all aspects. So I started without a logo”

References

External links
 
 Pattern Foundry Karel Martens applied work at Pattern Foundry
 Karel Martens: the impression that matters

Dutch graphic designers
Dutch typographers and type designers
Living people
1939 births
People from Mook en Middelaar
Winners of the Heineken Prize